Max Jenkins (born December 5, 1986) is an American professional racing cyclist.

Born in Novosibirsk, Russia, Jenkins emigrated to the United States when he was eight, and later obtained US citizenship in 2007. His first major result was winning the National under-23 road race championships. He began racing at the age of 15, and attended the University of California, Berkeley prior to turning professional. From 2010 to 2011, he rode for UCI Professional Continental team , notably finishing 11th overall in the 2011 Tour of Utah. The following year, he transferred to the  team in its second year of existence, notably alongside Francisco Mancebo and Chad Beyer. He rode in the men's team time trial with his team  at the 2015 UCI Road World Championships.

Major results
2007
 1st  Road race, National Under-23 Road Championships
2009
 8th Rogaland GP
2011
 4th Nevada City Classic
2012
 8th Overall Vuelta Mexico Telmex
2015
 2nd Nevada City Classic

References

External links

1986 births
Living people
American male cyclists
People from Novosibirsk
American people of Russian descent
Russian emigrants to the United States
Cyclists from California